This is a list of governors of the Umayyad province of Iraq.

Overview 
In medieval history, Iraq was the area comprising the lower parts of Mesopotamia, being roughly equivalent in size and shape to the ancient region of Babylonia. It was bounded to the northwest by al-Jazira, to the north by Adharbayjan (the Sassanid Aturpatakan), to the northeast by al-Jibal, to the east by al-Ahwaz, to the southeast by the Sea of Fars (the Persian Gulf), and to the southwest by the desert of Arabia.

In the administrative structure of the Umayyad Caliphate, Iraq was at first not a unified province; rather, it was divided between the governors of the important garrison towns of Basra and Kufa. The two towns were united for the first time in 670 AD, when the caliph Mu'awiyah ibn Abi Sufyan gave control of both to Ziyad ibn Abihi. After Ziyad's death the two towns were again separately administered, but subsequent caliphs were to repeat the combination and from the reign of 'Abd al-Malik ibn Marwan on, Iraq was usually in the hands of a single governor.

The governor of Iraq was an extremely powerful individual within the administrative hierarchy of the Umayyad government. In addition to Iraq itself, he was frequently granted the responsibility for the provinces of the empire that had originally been conquered with Basran or Kufan troops, including al-Ahwaz, al-Jibal, Fars, Kerman, Khurasan, Sijistan, Makran, al-Sind, and Jurjan. He was furthermore given authority over the provinces of eastern Arabia, namely al-Bahrayn, al-Yamamah and Oman. In total, these provinces constituted almost half of the entire empire and produced a substantial amount of the revenues collected by the central government in Damascus. The governor had the power to appoint and dismiss sub-governors to each of these provinces, and each of his sub-governors reported directly to him, rather than to the caliph.

Governors who were appointed to Iraq all took up residence within the province during their tenure of office; the specific seat of government, however, tended to change over time. Under Ziyad ibn Abihi, Basra and Kufa served as twin capitals and he stayed at both towns during each year of his governorship. Basra subsequently edged out Kufa as the chief town of the province, and served as the seat of the governors for the remainder of the seventh century. The famous governor al-Hajjaj ibn Yusuf al-Thaqafi ordered the construction of a third garrison town, that of Wasit, which he then used as his residence for the remainder of his life. Thereafter, Wasit was often used by the governors as their primary residence, although they continued to sporadically move to other towns, such as Kufa and al-Hirah.

Iraq remained as an Umayyad province until the year 749/750, when an Abbasid army besieged Wasit and forced the last governor of Iraq, Yazid ibn Umar al-Fazari, to surrender. Following their victory over the Umayyads, the Abbasids abolished the governorship of Iraq and resumed the practice of appointing separate governors to the individual districts of the region.

List of governors 
Only governors that were in control of both Basra and Kufa at the same time appear in this list.

See also
List of Umayyad governors of al-Andalus
List of Umayyad governors of Arminiyah                                                                      
List of Umayyad governors of Egypt
List of Umayyad governors of Ifriqiyah
List of Umayyad governors of Madinah
List of Umayyad governors of Sind

Notes

References 
Al-Askar, Abdullah. Al-Yamama in the Early Islamic Era. Reading, UK: Ithaca Press, 2002. 

Djaït, Hichem. Al-Kufa: Naissance de la Ville Islamique. Paris: Maisonneuve et Larose, 1986. 
The Encyclopaedia of Islam. New Ed. 12 vols. with supplement and indices. Leiden: E.J. Brill, 1960–2005.
Kennedy, Hugh. The Early Abbasid Caliphate: A Political History. London: Croom Helm, 1981. 
 
 
Al-Rawas, Isam. Oman in Early Islamic History. Reading, UK: Garnet Publishing Limited, 2000. 
Shaban, M. A. The 'Abbasid Revolution. Cambridge, UK: Cambridge University Press, 1970. 

Iraq, Ummayad
 
Medieval Islamic world-related lists